Lisa France (born May 15, 1967, in Quincy, Massachusetts) is a director and screenwriter known for directing Anne B. Real (2003) and writing Love and Suicide (2006). Her 2017 documentary, Roll with Me, won awards at the Virginia Film Festival, the Woodstock Film Festival, and the Milan International Film Festival, and was a special selection at the Slamdance Film Festival.

References

External links
 

Living people
1967 births
Writers from Quincy, Massachusetts
Film directors from Massachusetts